The Heaven Sword and Dragon Saber is a novel by Jin Yong. It may also refer to:

Hong Kong:
 The Heaven Sword and Dragon Saber (1978 TV series)
 The Heaven Sword and Dragon Saber (2000 TV series)
 Heaven Sword and Dragon Sabre (film), a two-part 1978 Hong Kong film

Taiwan:
 The Heaven Sword and Dragon Saber (1984 TV series)
 The Heaven Sword and Dragon Saber (1994 TV series)
 The Heaven Sword and Dragon Saber (2003 TV series)

China:
 The Heaven Sword and Dragon Saber (2009 TV series)

See also
 New Heavenly Sword and Dragon Sabre, a 1986 Hong Kong television series